Idalus ortus is a moth of the family Erebidae. It was described by William Schaus in 1892. It is found in Venezuela and Brazil.

References

ortus
Moths described in 1892